OR Group (Obuv Rossii) is a Russian shoe company founded in Novosibirsk in 2003 by Anton Titov.

History
The company was founded in 2003 in Novosibirsk.

In March 2007, a project was launched in several Novosibirsk stores of the company: customers could take an interest-free loan for 3–5 months to buy shoes, but the purchase had to be more than 3000 rubles, and as a result, sales in the shops grew by 15% in three months.

In 2010, the firm has signed a one-year advertising contract with singer Valeriya.

In 2015, Obuv Rossii bought the S-TEP, a Novosibirsk shoe company, which owned a shoe factory in Berdsk.

In November 2020, the company decided to change the name Obuv Rossii to OR Group; it also decided to go beyond the fashion segment and become a universal retailer developing a trading platform and online marketplace under the brand name Prodayom.

Brands
The company's stores operate under the brands Westfalika, Peshekhod, Rossita, Emilia Estra and Lisette. The OR Group also develops footwear and clothing brands for an active lifestyle: S-TEP, all.go and Snow Guard. The number of stores is 851, 175 of which are franchised.

Shoe factories
The company owns two shoe factories in Novosibirsk and Berdsk. It also planned to build a shoe factory in Linyovo, Novosibirsk Oblast, but refused to build it due to problems associated with the coronavirus pandemic.

Finance

2020
 Revenue – 10.8 billion rubles;
 Net profit - 600 million rubles;
 EBITDA – 2.3 billion rubles.

Headquarters
The company's headquarters is located in Kalininsky District at Bohdan Khmelnitsky Street 56. The OR Group occupies a 6-storey building that previously belonged to the Belon coal mining company.

See also
 KORS

References

Companies based in Novosibirsk
Shoe companies
Retail companies established in 2003